Maibi is a village in Bihar state, India. It is one of seven villages of Maibi panchayat (Baswan, Amarupi, Beharpur, Maibi, Bahera, Sonbarsa, and Manmohan) in the Lakhnaur block, Jhanjharpur subdivision, Madhubani District of Bihar.

Maibi is populated by various castes, such as Kyot (Kaiwarts, Brahmins, Koir, Chamar, Dom, as well as by Muslims.

Items of Note 
Baba Tapneshwarnath Temple of Shiva
The Janmashtmi and the Durga Puja festivals are celebrated in Maibi.

References

Villages in Madhubani district